Gisken is a Norwegian female given name.  Notable people with the name include:

 Gisken Armand (born 1962), Norwegian actress
 Gisken Wildenvey (1892–1985), Norwegian author

Norwegian feminine given names